This is a list of current synagogues in Ottawa, Ontario, Canada:

Current synagogues

Reform 

Temple Israel

Reconstructionist 

Or Haneshamah

Conservative 

Adath Shalom
Kehillat Beth Israel

Modern Orthodox 

 Beit Tikvah of Ottawa

Glebe Shul
Machzikei Hadas

Orthodox 

Orthodox Community Ohev Yisroel
Young Israel of Ottawa

Chabad 

Congregation Lubavitch
Ottawa Torah Center Chabad
Chabad of Centrepointe
Chabad of Kanata
Finkelstein Chabad Jewish Centre

Former synagogues

Conservative 

Agudath Israel, merged with Congregation Beth Shalom and became Kehillat Beth Israel
Congregation Beth Shalom, originally Orthodox and later Conservative, merged with Agudath Israel and became Kehillat Beth Israel. Beth Shalom is the result of the amalgamation of Adath Jeshurun, Agudath Achim and later B'nai Jacob Congregation.

Orthodox 

Adath Jeshurun, founded in 1904 on King Edward Avenue, designed by John William Hurrell Watts. The building still exists, but is now the Ottawa French Seventh-day Adventist Church
Agudath Achim, founded in 1912 on Rideau Street, designed by Cecil Burgess
B'nai Jacob Congregation, founded in 1910, in what is today Centretown

See also

List of Ottawa churches
List of Ottawa mosques
List of religious buildings in Ottawa

References

External links

 List of Community Organizations at Jewish Federation of Ottawa
 Chabad-Lubavitch Centers in Ottawa, Ontario Canada
 Kollel of Ottawa and Centre for Jewish Education

Jews and Judaism in Ottawa

Synagogues in Ottawa
Synagogues
Ottawa